The Cowdrey Lecture, also referred to as the MCC Spirit of Cricket Cowdrey Lecture, is an annual event organised by the Marylebone Cricket Club (MCC) at Lord's Cricket Ground.

The event was first hosted in 2001, following the death of its eponym Late Lord Colin Cowdrey, in December 2000. Colin Cowdrey is reported to have been instrumental in adapting the Captains' Charter as the Spirit of Cricket and subsequently adding it as the preamble to the Laws of Cricket.

It is held annually during the English summer and is delivered by pre-eminent cricketing personalities. The event is an invite only affair, with high-profile cricketing personalities, représentatives of cricketing boards and journalists in attendance. The format of the event is simple: the Cowdrey Lecture followed by an informal discussion/question-answer session with a panel of distinguished personalities.

List of all lectures till date 

* - Denotes Lecturers who received standing ovations from the audience.

Notable facts 

 Desmond Tutu and Stephen Fry are the only non cricketing personalities to have ever delivered a Cowdrey lecture.

 Desmond Tutu, Kumar Sangakkara and Stephen Fry are the only personalities to have received a standing ovation for their speech.
The event was cancelled in 2020 due to COVID-19 pandemic.

Lecturers by country

See also 
 International Cricket Council (ICC)
 ICC Cricket Hall of Fame

References 

Annual events in London
British lecture series
Cricket culture
Marylebone Cricket Club
2001 establishments in England